The Valenciano River is a river in eastern Puerto Rico which flows through the municipalities of Juncos and Las Piedras, Puerto Rico. After Juncos, the river reaches a confluence on the left bank of the Río Gurabo, which is itself a tributary of the Río Grande de Loíza which flows north into the Atlantic Ocean. Since Hurricane Maria in September 217, the data on river drainage has not been updated.

See also
List of rivers of Puerto Rico

References

External links
 USGS Hydrologic Unit Map – Caribbean Region (1974)
Rios de Puerto Rico

Rivers of Puerto Rico